Letters from Burma is a book of essays by Aung San Suu Kyi published in 1997. It has been published in English and Japanese.

References

External links
 Google Books page

Essays about politics
Aung San Suu Kyi